There are several suffixes in Hebrew that are appended to regular words to introduce a new meaning. Suffixes are used in the Hebrew language to form plurals of nouns and adjectives, in verb conjugation of grammatical tense, and to indicate possession and direct objects. They are also used for the construct noun form. The letters which form these suffixes (excluding plurals) are called "formative letters" (Hebrew: , Otiyot HaShimush).

Gender and number
Due to noun-adjective agreement rules, these apply to nouns and to adjectival modifiers. In some cases, a masculine plural noun will have a feminine plural suffix and vice versa, but the adjectival modifiers are always the same.

Construct state

Pronominal suffixes

Singular nouns

Plural nouns

Conjugation of verbs

Qal Perfect

Imperfect

Imperative

Derivative

Diminutive

Abstract nouns

Collective nouns

Loanwords

These suffixes (Hebrew:   sofit) often come from loanwords from English (Latin, Greek, etc...) which are especially prevalent with technical and academic terms.

See also
 Affix
 Hebrew grammar
 Hebrew verb conjugation
 Prefixes in Hebrew
 Preposition
 Suffix
 Dual (grammatical number)

References

External links
 Hebrew Language: Root Words

Hebrew grammar
Suffixes